El Quiteño Libre was a weekly newspaper from the city of Quito, Ecuador, in 1833. The newspaper was founded by political opponents of president Juan José Flores. One of the writers for the newspaper was politician Pedro Moncayo.

History of Ecuador
Newspapers published in Ecuador
Publications disestablished in 1833
Publications established in 1833
Mass media in Quito
Spanish-language newspapers
Defunct newspapers